Michael J. Skindell (born 1962) is the state representative for the 13th district of the Ohio House of Representatives after previously serving there from 2003 to 2010. He also previously served as the state senator for the 23rd district of the Ohio Senate from 2011 to 2018. He is a Democrat.

Life and career
Skindell graduated from Walsh College (now Walsh University) in North Canton, Ohio, with a Bachelor of Arts in Business and Political Science in 1983.  He received his Juris Doctor from the Cleveland State University College of Law in 1987.  He is a practicing attorney with the firm of Friedman, Domiano and Smith in Cleveland, specializing in personal injury and product liability.

He is a past president of the Lakewood Jaycees, and past Chairman of Lakewood Citizens Advisory Committee for Community Development Block Grant.  He is a former Assistant Attorney General of Ohio, and former member of Lakewood City Council.  In 2004, he received the award for Ohio Environmental Council Public Servant of the Year.

After an unsuccessful run in the primary election in 1996, Skindell was first elected to the Ohio House of Representatives in 2002 taking the place of Congresswoman Mary Rose Oakar who retired after serving one term in the State House.

Skindell ran unopposed in 2004 for a second term, and won a third in 2006 with 77.26% of the vote over Republican John Patrick Hildebrand. He won a fourth term in 2008 with 75.29% over Republican Mary Louise Kirk.

While serving in the Ohio House, Skindell encouraged adoption of a renewable energy portfolio standard in Ohio. The General Assembly passed Senate Bill 221, creating a standards program, in 2008 upon which Governor Ted Strickland signed the legislation.

In 2012, Skindell opted to run for the Ohio Supreme Court, but lost to incumbent Terrence O'Donnell 70% to 30%.

Ohio Senate
Term limits prevented Skindell from seeking a fifth term in 2010. However, Senator Dale Miller did not run for another term, and Skindell was one of four who sought the Democratic nomination to replace him. Skindell won the nomination over former Rep. Ron Mottl Jr., Parma Councilman Nicholas Celebrezze and John Harmon with 46.82% of the vote. He won the general election easily with 60.77% of the electorate.

Skindell was sworn into his first term as Senator on January 3, 2011.

Committee assignments
 Civil Justice
 Finance
 Finance – Transportation Subcommittee (Ranking Minority Member)
 State and Local Government
 Technology and Innovation

Electoral history

Personal life
Skindell is single and resides in Lakewood, Ohio.

Controversy
In 2000, Skindell and Lakewood City Council colleague Nancy Roth introduced legislation to extend health and other benefits to unmarried couples. Public perception latched onto the legislation as a proxy for arguments over same-sex marriage and cultural change, with hundreds of people in attendance at a single committee hearing in January 2000. Other council members eventually rejected the proposal, 5-2.

Skindell led a Democratic effort to stop film tax credit legislation in 2008, drawing scorn from the Cleveland Plain Dealer. Studies at the time and since have found film tax credits’ fiscal and job benefits are negligible.

Skindell was a contrary voice within the Ohio House’s Democratic majority during 2009 budget battles. As a Budget Committee member, Skindell announced that he would vote against Democratic leaders’ budget without more resources for adult and child protective services and independent living centers for foster kids. During a later standoff between Democratic Governor Ted Strickland and Republican Senate President Bill Harris, Ohio House leadership passed a temporary budget; Skindell voted against the rare procedure, remarking that the temporary budget including 30% cuts "offers despair, not hope."

In 2015 and 2016, Skindell championed the cause of Lakewood Hospital against a plan to close the facility, supported by then-mayor Michael P. Summers and most of Lakewood City Council. Lakewood Hospital became a major political and legal controversy in the city, although the mayor and council ultimately pushed through the planned closure despite significant protest.

References

External links
The Ohio Senate: Senator Michael J. Skindell (D) - District 23
Project Vote Smart profile
Follow the Money
2006 2004 2002 1996 campaign contributions

1962 births
Living people
Cleveland–Marshall College of Law alumni
Democratic Party members of the Ohio House of Representatives
People from Lakewood, Ohio
Democratic Party Ohio state senators
21st-century American politicians
Walsh College alumni